James Campbell (25 November 1918 – 12 January 2011) was a Scottish amateur footballer who played in the Football League for Walsall. After his retirement as a player, he coached Reading, Motherwell and St Johnstone.

Personal life 
Campell was the song of former Reading footballer James Campbell. Campbell was educated at Bernard Street School and Whitehill Secondary School in Glasgow and the University of Birmingham. During the Second World War, he served in the Royal Army Dental Corps, the Army Physical Training Corps, trained the French Resistance and acted as a bodyguard for Hardy Amies. He married in 1943 and was the grandfather of actor Scott Speedman. After the war, Campbell established a dental practice in Glasgow and joined Glasgow Dental Hospital and School.

Career statistics

Honours 
Nuneaton Borough

 Birmingham Senior Cup: 1947–48
 Atherstone Nursing Cup: 1947–48
 Nuneaton Hospital Cup: 1947–48

References 

Scottish footballers
Clapton Orient F.C. wartime guest players
1918 births
2011 deaths
Military personnel from Glasgow
People from Bridgeton, Glasgow
Celtic F.C. players
Association football outside forwards
Aldershot F.C. wartime guest players
Folkestone F.C. players
Chelsea F.C. wartime guest players
Partick Thistle F.C. wartime guest players
Leicester City F.C. players
Walsall F.C. players
English Football League players
Reading F.C. non-playing staff
Motherwell F.C. non-playing staff
St Johnstone F.C. non-playing staff
Scottish dentists
People educated at Whitehill Secondary School
British Army personnel of World War II
Royal Army Dental Corps soldiers
Royal Army Physical Training Corps soldiers
Nuneaton Borough F.C. players
Alumni of the University of Birmingham
Aston Villa F.C. players
20th-century dentists